Fatima bint Musa (born 1st Dhu al-Qadah 173 AH – 10th or 12th of Rabi' al-Thani 201 AH; approximately March 22, 790 AD – November 7 or 9, 816 AD), commonly known as Fatima al-Ma'suma was the daughter of the seventh Twelver Shia Imam, Musa al-Kazim and sister of the eighth Twelver Shia Imams, Ali al-Rida. Every year, millions of Shia Muslims travel to Qom to honor Fatima al-Ma'suma at her shrine.

Fatima al-Ma'suma is the eldest daughter of Musa al-Kazim, whom the Shi'ites consider to be the holiest child of Musa al-Kazim after her brother Ali al-Rida.

Fatima al-Ma'suma has been highly praised in the narrations and speeches of four Shi'ite Imams, so much so that Ja'far al-Sadiq, the sixth Imam of Shi'ites in two narrations, Ali al-Rida, the eighth Imam of Shi'ites in five narrations And Muhammad al-Jawad, the ninth Imam of the Shi'ites, has emphasized in a narration that whoever visits Fatima al-Ma'suma in Qom will go to heaven.

Another prominent feature of Fatima al-Ma'suma is her position of intercession. According to the narration of Ja'far al-Sadiq and Ali al-Rida, he will intercede for the Shi'ites on the Day of Judgment so that all of them will enter Paradise.

Another prominent feature of Fatima al-Ma'suma is her birth prediction. This feature has not happened to any of the children of Shi'ite Imams.

There are two reports from two different people that Ja'far al-Sadiq, the sixth Imam of the Shi'ites, predicted Fatima's birth 45 years before her birth. These predictions mention his name and that of his father and his burial place.

Another advantage of Fatima al-Ma'suma, as Ja'far al-Sadiq pointed out, is that (the shrine of Fatima al-Ma'suma in Qom is the shrine of all Shi'ite Imams).

This means that all twelve Shi'ite Imams are present in the shrine of Fatima al-Ma'suma and whoever visits Fatima al-Ma'suma in Qom seems to have visited all twelve Shi'ite Imams.

Another very valuable feature of Fatima al-Ma'suma is the title of her (al-Ma'suma) by Ali al-Rida

al-Ma'suma in Arabic means pure and innocent. Ali al-Rida's purpose in giving this name to his sister was to prove that Fatima al-Ma'suma is a pure and innocent human being, which is very valuable for Shi'ites. And shows that Fatima al-Ma'suma has a degree of infallibility

History of Fatima al-Ma'suma
It is written that even before she was born, Shi'i Imams foretold Fatima al-Ma'suma's holiness and piety. Fatima was born into Shi'i legacy, raised under the care of two Imams - her father and her brother - and she is said to have absorbed their knowledge and holiness. Fatima al-Ma'suma was born in Medina in 173 AH and spent the first six years of her life learning alongside her father, Imam Musa al-Kazim. Scholars have written that she had a "special gift" of knowledge and spiritual awareness, even in childhood. When she was ten years old, Harun al-Rashid, the 5th caliph of the Abbasid Caliphate sent her father to prison. This separation was very difficult for Fatima, but her brother Ali was 25 years her senior and took care of her.

Ali and Fatima are among Imam Musa al-Kazim's 37 children, but they are the only two children from the Imam's marriage to Najma Khatun. Their mother was a former slave from North Africa who became very learned in Islamic teachings under the guidance of Imam Musa al-Kazim's mother, Lady Hamida. Ali would later become the 8th Imam and gain the title Imam Ali al-Rida. The historian al-Tabari states that 'Al-Rida' means "The One Well-pleasing [to God] from the House of Muhammad." He was appointed successor to the Abassid Caliph al-Ma'mun, though he was hesitant in accepting this role. As Ali al-Rida gained the title of "Crowned Prince" , some people refused to accept his role amidst civil war. Ali al-Rida revealed the extent of this revolt to al-Ma'mun, stating that people considered him (al-Ma'mun) "bewitched and mentally deranged," were hiding reports from him, and had given their allegiance to his paternal uncle Ibrahim ibn al-Mahdi instead of him.

In 200 AH, al-Ma'mun called for Ali al-Rida to leave for Khorasan and Fatima al-Ma'suma was forced to live apart from her brother. After one year of separation from her brother, Fatima al-Ma'suma decided to join him. She did not leave solely because of her wish to live near her brother; scholars also suggest that Fatima al-Ma'suma's knowledge and religiosity would help her brother in his political office, especially in decisions regarding women. In 201 AH she set off in a caravan of 23 family and friends of Imam Ali al-Rida, alongside another caravan of 12,000 people traveling to Khorasan. The caravans never made it to Khorasan, though, and Fatima al-Ma'suma never reached her brother. They were attacked by agents of the caliph while at Saveh; some fled, but many were wounded, taken prisoner, or killed. Fatima al-Ma'suma survived, but was forced to watch the murders of 23 close family members and friends. It is written that Fatima al-Ma'suma was then poisoned by a woman. Fatima became ill and asked to be taken to Qom, where she died and was buried in her host's land.

Birth predictions
There are two reports recorded from two different people that Imam Ja'far al-Sadiq predicted the birth of Fatima. Both predictions mention that she will intercede on behalf of the Shi'a or help gain admittance to Heaven by visiting her Shrine. These two predictions were also made before her father was born as well, so about 45 years before her birth.

Lady Hamida was the mother of Fatima's father as well as the owner of Fatima's mother, Lady Najma. Lady Hamida had a dream that the Prophet told her that Najma needed to become the wife of her son, so that she could birth “the best people in the world”. While Najma was more focused on the son, Imam al-Rida, she would birth Fatima also as a product of the marriage.

In the works of Western travel writers 
Garcia de Silva, in a journey to Qom, writes that the people of Qom, and especially their women, owed themselves to one of the Alawite women who migrated to the city and provided services such as a hospital and inn, and they are trying to Haya and holiness, look like her. However, Garcia has known the name of the woman as Lily and the daughter of Fatima al-Zahra and the sister of Hasan and Husayn who fled Baghdad for the oppression of the rulers; But the journalist calls him Fatima al-Ma'suma, who has mistakenly referred to her as Lily.

In describing Fatima al-Ma'suma, Jean Chardin writes: 'Because the caliphs of Baghdad were torturing the Shi'ites of Ali and all Shi'ite Imams, Musa al-Kazim, the father of al-Ma'suma, emigrated her to the city of Qom. al-Ma'suma built large monuments during his stay in the city; And finally, in the same city, he surrendered to life. The Shi'ites believe that the al-Ma'suma has ascens to the heavens after her death and is nothing in her shrine, and these great monuments have been remembered. 'Similar to Chardin's report, Henry d'Allemagne is quoted in his travelogue; He writes that Fatima al-Ma'suma came from Karbala to Qom to protect the Abbasid caliphs. Jamali Karri also considers the buried lady in Qom to be the daughter of Husayn ibn Ali.

Gallery

See also
 Holiest sites in Shia Islam

References

Literature
 Zohreh Sadeghi: Fāṭima von Qum: Ein Beispiel für die Verehrung heiliger Frauen im Volksglauben der Zwölfer-Schia. K.Schwarz Verlag, Berlin 1996, .

Family of Muhammad
Qom
Qom Province
9th-century Arabs
790 births
816 deaths
Burials at Fatima Masumeh Shrine